Stonycreek can refer to:
Stonycreek Township, Cambria County, Pennsylvania
Stonycreek Township, Somerset County, Pennsylvania
Stonycreek River, in Pennsylvania

See also
Stony Creek (disambiguation)
Stoney Creek (disambiguation)
Steinbach (disambiguation)